Bahram Beyg (also Romanized as Bahrām Beyg) is a village in Kunani Rural District, Kunani District, Kuhdasht County, Lorestan Province, Iran.

Population
At the 2006 census, its population was 703, in 139 families.

References 

Towns and villages in Kuhdasht County